The Buffalo Bulls wrestling team is a varsity intercollegiate athletic team of the University at Buffalo in Amherst, New York, United States. The team is a member of the Mid-American Conference (MAC), which is part of the National Collegiate Athletic Association's Division I. The team plays their home matches at Alumni Arena in Amherst, New York. The Bulls are coached by John Stutzman.

History
In 1978, Buffalo won the NCAA Division III Wrestling Championship. In 1995, the entire 1977–78 team was inducted into the school's athletics hall of fame. , it is the school's only national champion team in any NCAA sport.

In 1999, Buffalo's first year in the MAC, John Eschenfelder won the conference's individual championship in the heavyweight division. Two years later he became the first Bulls  wrestler to win multiple individual MAC wrestling championships.

In 2004, Kyle Cerminara became the first UB wrestler to be named an All-American. He graduated in 2006 as the school's all-time leader in wins with 137.

At the 2011 MAC Wrestling Tournament, Buffalo led all teams with four individual champions (Andrew Schutt, Desi Green, Mark Lewandowski and John-Martin Cannon), a program record, but placed third nonetheless. John-Martin Cannon became the first UB wrestler named the Outstanding Wrestler of the Tournament and the school sent a record five wrestlers to the NCAA Division I Wrestling Championships.

National championships

Individual

Team

References

External links